Leonidas Kaselakis (Greek: Λεωνίδας Κασελάκης; born June 1, 1990) is a Greek professional basketball player and the team captain for Peristeri of the Greek Basket League. He is a 2.02 m (6 ft 7  in) tall, 109 kg (240 lbs.) small forward, who can also play at the power forward position if needed.

Professional career
Kaselakis began his professional career in the Greek 2nd division with Ilysiakos. He signed a two-year contract with the Greek Basket League club, PAOK Thessaloniki in 2012. In 2014, he moved to AEK Athens. He was named the Greek League Most Improved Player in 2016 as a player of Nea Kifisia. 

On July 17, 2016, Kaselakis signed with the Kazakh VTB United League team Astana, where he spent two successful seasons.

On June 27, 2018, Kaselakis returned to Greece and signed a two-year contract with Promitheas Patras.

On August 7, 2020, Kaselakis signed a one-year contract with Greek Basket League champions and EuroLeague mainstays Panathinaikos. In the Greek Basket League, he averaged 4.1 points and 2.3 rebounds, playing around 13 minutes per contest. Additionally, in 28 EuroLeague matches, he averaged 2.2 points and 1.5 rebounds, playing around 10 minutes per contest. 

On July 26, 2021, Kaselakis agreed to extend his contract with the Greens for another season. In 32 league games, he averaged 5.6 points, 3.2 rebounds and 1.3 assists, playing around 18 minutes per contest. Additionally, in 31 EuroLeague games, he averaged 3.7 points and 2 rebounds, playing around 15 minutes per contest.

On June 28, 2022, Kaselakis signed a two-year contract with Peristeri of the Greek Basket League and the Basketball Champions League.

National team career

Greek junior national team
As a member of the junior national basketball teams of Greece, Kaselakis won the gold medal at the 2008 FIBA Europe Under-18 Championship and the silver medal at the 2009 FIBA Under-19 World Cup. He also won the gold medal at the 2009 FIBA Europe Under-20 Championship and the silver medal at the 2010 FIBA Europe Under-20 Championship with Greece's junior national team.

Greek senior national team
Kaselakis first became a member of the senior Greek national basketball team in 2018. He played at the 2019 FIBA World Cup qualification.

Awards and accomplishments

Pro career
Greek League Most Improved Player: (2016)

Greek junior national team
2008 Albert Schweitzer Tournament: 
2008 FIBA Europe Under-18 Championship: 
2009 FIBA Under-19 World Cup: 
2009 FIBA Europe Under-20 Championship: 
2010 FIBA Europe Under-20 Championship:

References

External links
EuroCup Profile
FIBA Profile
Eurobasket.com Profile
Greek Basket League Profile 
Greek Basket League Profile 

1990 births
Living people
AEK B.C. players
Basketball players at the 2015 European Games
BC Astana players
European Games competitors for Greece
Greek expatriate basketball people in Kazakhstan
Greek men's basketball players
Ilysiakos B.C. players
Nea Kifissia B.C. players
Panathinaikos B.C. players
Promitheas Patras B.C. players
Power forwards (basketball)
Small forwards
Basketball players from Athens
21st-century Greek people